Broyes is the name or part of the name of the following communes in France:

 Broyes, Marne, in the Marne department
 Broyes, Oise, in the Oise department
 Saint-Remy-sous-Broyes, in the Marne department